Jurgis Dobkevičius  (born March 23, 1900 in Saint Petersburg, died testing his own construction airplane Dobi-III in a crash June 8, 1926 in Kaunas) was a Lithuanian aviator and aircraft designer.

Military biography
Dobkevičius was a volunteer of the Lithuanian Army and the first officially recognised military pilot of the Lithuanian Air Force, Commander of Air Squadron in 1920. Dobkevičius participated as reconnaissance pilot in Lithuanian-Polish War, completing 24 combat missions.

He was also known for his outstanding memory—contemporary sources say that at the dinner table he played one or two games of chess with any opponent without a board. Dobkevičius was one of the first football players in Lithuania, in 1922 playing for "Aviacija", an Air Force team.

Engineering career 

After retiring from military service in 1923, Dobkevičius studied at L'Ecole Superieure d'Aeronautique in Paris, graduating in 1925 and becoming the first professional Lithuanian aircraft designer. Dobkevičius designed a line of aircraft Dobi: Dobi-I, Dobi-II and the fatal variant, Dobi-III.

Jurgis Dobkevičius was buried in Panemunė Cemetery.

References

External links
Short biography and photo
Article about Dobkevičius

1900 births
1926 deaths
Aviators killed in aviation accidents or incidents
Lithuanian aerospace engineers
Lithuanian Army officers
Lithuanian aviators
Victims of aviation accidents or incidents in Lithuania
Victims of aviation accidents or incidents in 1926